Sherif El-Masri  (born 5 February 1990) is a Canadian professional soccer player who plays as a winger.

Early and personal life
He was born in Scarborough, Ontario to a Tunisian father and a Guyanese mother. His younger sister Mariam is also a soccer player who represents Guyana internationally.

Club career
He began playing for Wexford SC at the age of five. He joined the Toronto Lynx when he was 14. When he was 16, he went to Italy for two months training with FC Matera before he decided to return to Canada to finish his high school diploma. He played for the Lynx senior team in the Premier Development League in 2008.

In 2008, he went to France where he joined FC Rouen in the Championnat National 2.

Late in 2018, he went to Singapore for a soccer trial, where he played two games, scoring a hat-trick in the first game. From this trial, he joined Singaporean club Home United in 2009, spending the 2010 and 2011 seasons with their senior team. He then moved to Young Lions, playing for them for the 2012 to 2015 seasons.

International career
El-Masri made three appearances for the Canadian under-23 national team in 2012. In November 2015 he announced his desire to represent Singapore at international level, subject to receiving a Singaporean passport. He was announced as part of the Guyana senior team's provisional squad in September 2016.

Honours
Home United
 Singapore Cup: 2011

References

1990 births
Living people
Sportspeople from Scarborough, Toronto
Canadian sportspeople of Guyanese descent
Canadian people of Tunisian descent
Soccer players from Toronto
Canadian soccer players
Home United FC players
Young Lions FC players
Singapore Premier League players
Association football wingers
Canada men's under-23 international soccer players
Canadian expatriate soccer players
Canadian expatriate sportspeople in Singapore
Expatriate footballers in Singapore
Toronto Lynx players
FC Rouen players
Canadian expatriate sportspeople in France
Expatriate footballers in France
USL League Two players
Alliance United FC players